Face Off! is a hockey video game developed by Mindspan Technologies and published by GameStar on 1989. The game's features include not only the ability to play with your chosen hockey player, but also game plans, team maneuvers and management.

Gameplay 

The game offers play with single-player mode, two humans in cooperative mode or in versus mode. The player can control only one hockey player at a time, that can only be changed during interruptions of play. You can choose to play with 1, 3 or 5 players on each team.

The aspects that made this game famous were the change of camera angle if the hockey player shoots and it is close to the goaltender, and the mini-fight game scenario during the match that occurs sometimes when a player commits a foul on an opposite team's member.

References

External links 
Face Off! at Abandonia

1989 video games
Commodore 64 games
DOS games
National Hockey League video games
Video games scored by Russell Lieblich
Video games developed in Canada